Rose Lefebvre (1743–1774) was a French pastellist.

Born in Abbeville, Lefebvre was the daughter of engraver Philippe-Augustin Lefebvre and his wife, Marie-Claudine Galuchet. Charles Wignier de Warre claimed that she was a talented pastellist, and described her as a member of the Accademia di San Luca.

References

1743 births
1774 deaths
French women painters
18th-century French painters
18th-century French women artists
Pastel artists
People from Abbeville